Lagioia is an Italian surname. Notable people with the surname include: 

 Gemma Lagioia (born 2001), Australian rules footballer
 Nicola Lagioia (born 1973), Italian writer

Italian-language surnames